Monty Tiwa (born 28 August 1976 in Jakarta) is an Indonesian screenwriter, composer, film editor, film producer and film director. Monty Tiwa enrolled in University of Kansas before he returned to Indonesia and worked as creative writer for Trans TV (2002–2003), head section creative for RCTI (2003–2004) and creative director for MNC (2004–2005).

Currently, Monty works as an independent writer and film director.

Filmography
Maaf, Saya Telah Menghamili Istri Anda (2007) - director / writer
Pocong 3 (2007) - director / writer
XL Extra Large (2008) - director / writer
Barbi3 (2008) - director
Wakil Rakyat (2009) - director
Homses A short film (2009) - director / writer / editor
Keramat (2009) - director / writer
Laskar Pemimpi (2010) - writer / editor / director
XXL (2009) - writer/producer
Andai Ia Tahu - writer
Vina Bilang Cinta - writer
Biarkan Bintang Menari - writer
9 Naga - writer
Ujang Pantry - writer / editor
Juli di bulan Juni - writer
Mendadak Dangdut - writer
Denias - writer
Pocong 1 - writer
Pocong 2 - writer / editor
Dunia Mereka - writer
Mengejar Mas-Mas - writer
Otomatis Romantis - writer/producer
Anak Setan - writer/producer

Other works
Biarkan Bintang Menari - original soundtrack with Andi Rianto
Mendadak Dangdut - original soundtrack with hits Jablay
Indonesian Idol - theme song
Dunia Mereka 1 & 2 - books

Awards
Best Screenwriter, Festival Film Indonesia 2005 for Juli di Bulan Juni
Best Editor, Festival Film Indonesia 2006 for Ujang Pantry 2
Best Screenwriter, Festival Film Indonesia 2006 for Denias

External links

1976 births
Living people
Indonesian film directors
Indonesian screenwriters
Indonesian people of Filipino descent
People from Jakarta
People of Sangirese descent